Elemér is a masculine given name, the Hungarian form of the Slavic Velimir, and may refer to:
Elemér Berkessy (1905–1993), Hungarian footballer and coach
Elemér Bokor (1887–1928), Hungarian entomologist
Elemér Csák (born 1944), Hungarian journalist and politician 
Elemér Gergátz (born 6 May 1942), Hungarian politician, former Minister of Agriculture
Elemér Gorondy-Novák (1885-1954), Hungarian military officer
Elemér Gyulai (1904-1945), Hungarian composer
Elemér Hankiss (1928–2015), Hungarian sociologist and educator
Elemér Kiss (born 1944), Hungarian jurist and politician 
Elemér Kondás (born 1963), Hungarian footballer and football manager
Elemér Kocsis (1910-1981), Romanian footballer
Elemér Pászti (1889–1965), Hungarian gymnast and 1912 Olympic competitor 
Elemér Somfay (1898–1979), Hungarian track & field athlete and 1924 and 1932 Olympic competitor
Elemér Szathmáry (1926-1971), Hungarian swimmer and 1948 Olympic silver medalist 
Elemér Terták (1918-1999), Hungarian figure skater and 1936 Olympic competitor
Elemér Thury (1874–1944), Hungarian film actor

Hungarian masculine given names
Masculine given names